Amitabha Bagchi is an Indian author, who was awarded DSC Prize for South Asian Literature in 2019 and shortlisted for JCB Prize for Literature and The Hindu Literary Prize for his novel Half the Night is Gone. He is the author of four novels.

Personal life 
He was born in 1974 in Delhi and is currently serving as Professor of Computer science in IIT Delhi. He was awarded the DSC Prize for South Asian Literature at the Nepal Literature Festival.

References 

20th-century Indian writers
1974 births
Academic staff of IIT Delhi
Living people